Nettenchelys erroriensis is an eel in the family Nettastomatidae (duckbill/witch eels). It was described by Emma Stanislavovna Karmovskaya in 1994. It is a marine, deep water-dwelling eel which is known from Error Seamount (from which its species epithet is derived), in the western Indian Ocean.

References

Nettastomatidae
Fish described in 1994